The Carosue Dam Gold Mine is a gold mine located south of Laverton, Western Australia.

Carosue Dam was previously owned by the now defunct mining company Sons of Gwalia Limited. Purchased in 2005, the mine was placed into care and maintenance by new owners St Barbara in June 2005 and sold to Saracen Mineral Holdings in February 2006. Saracen reopened the mine in early 2010. It is now owned and operated by Northern Star Resources after a merger with Saracen in 2021.

History

Located within the South Laverton gold field, situated 120 km north east of Kalgoorlie, the processing plant at Carosue Dam was constructed and commissioned in 2000, then owned by Pacmin Mining. In October 2001, it was acquired by Sons of Gwalia. During its five-year operation until June 2005, the mine produced over 700,000 ounces of gold.

Sons of Gwalia went into administration on 30 August 2004 and the company's gold mining operations were sold to St Barbara Limited in March 2005 for A$38 million, having been valued by the Sons of Gwalia directors at A$120 million. It was one of four gold mines sold to St Barbara in this deal, the other three being the Marvel Loch Gold Mine, the Tarmoola Gold Mine and the Gwalia Gold Mine.

After the collapse of Sons of Gwalia in 2004, the mine continued producing but was placed in care and maintenance by St Barbara three months after its purchase.

In October 2005, St Barbara announced the sale of Carosue Dam to Saracens for A$19.4 million in cash and shares. St Barbara acquired a 20% interest in Saracens through this transaction.

With the purchase of the mine by Saracen, the new owners developed a two-staged plan to reopen the mine in 2010. After a period of open pit mining, lasting for three to five years, the second stage will also include an underground operation.

On 15 June 2009 Saracen announced that the mine would be connected to the Western Power grid through a 90 km power line rather than being supplied by diesel generators on site. This line, scheduled to be completed in late 2010, is estimated to cost between $10 to 15 million but should provide the company with savings in the range of $50 to 100 per ounce of gold produced.

In November 2009, Saracen announced that the $7 million construction project at the mine had been finished and plant commissioning had started. Gold production was scheduled to begin in February 2010, with the first gold pour announced on 29 January 2010.

In October 2020, a merger between Northern Star Resources and Saracen Metal Holdings was proposed and completed in February 2021 when Saracen was de-listed from the Australian Securities Exchange.

As of 2022, the mine operated by Northern Star Resources as an underground and surface operation.

A 5MW solar power station was commissioned in June 2022 to reduce the mine's emissions by over 5600 tonnes per year.

Production
Production of the mine:

Notes

 2002 results for January to September only.
 28 March to 30 June period only.

References

Bibliography

External links 
 
 MINEDEX website: Carosue Dam - Khartoum Database of the Department of Mines, Industry Regulation and Safety

Gold mines in Western Australia
Surface mines in Australia
Underground mines in Australia
City of Kalgoorlie–Boulder
2000 establishments in Australia